Jacob Luitjens (18 April 1919 – 14 December 2022) was a Dutch collaborator during World War II. He was nicknamed the terror of Roden, as he was active in and around Roden in the Drenthe Province. He was born in Buitenzorg, Dutch East Indies.

After the war, on 10 September 1948, Luitjens was convicted and sentenced in absentia to life imprisonment. He evaded this punishment by fleeing to Paraguay, aided by Mennonites, using the name "Gerhard Harder". He emigrated to Canada in 1961, where he became an instructor in the Department of Botany at the University of British Columbia in Vancouver. Students in the department knew him as an almost completely silent "ghost-like" man.

The Frisian Jack Kooistra, also known as 'the Frisian Simon Wiesenthal', managed to track down Luitjens in 1992. Luitjens was stripped of his Canadian citizenship and was deported to the Netherlands, where he was imprisoned. He resumed his life sentence at a prison in Groningen until March 1995. Afterwards, the Canadian government forbade his return to Canada. Luitjens was without a nationality thereafter. Ian Kagedan of B'nai Brith Canada characterized the deportation as part of an ongoing "quest" to bring Nazi war criminals to justice.

Luitjens granted an interview in January 2022, at the age of 102. He died on 14 December 2022, at the age of 103.

References

External links
 CBC News article "Canada and war criminals: A timeline" 
 CBC News article "Fleeing Justice: War Criminals in Canada"  
  University of British Columbia campus newspaper article, 20 July 1983 (p3) 
 Bnai Brith article: "The Struggle for Justice: Nazi War Criminals in Canada"

1919 births
2022 deaths
People from Bogor
Military history of the Netherlands during World War II
Dutch people of World War II
Loss of Canadian citizenship by prior Nazi affiliation
People extradited from Canada
People extradited to the Netherlands
Dutch prisoners and detainees
Dutch collaborators with Nazi Germany
Academic staff of the University of British Columbia
Dutch emigrants to Canada
Dutch people of the Dutch East Indies
Dutch centenarians
Men centenarians

People convicted of treason
Prisoners sentenced to life imprisonment by the Netherlands